The 2013–2014 UCI Cyclo-cross World Cup events and season-long competition took place between 20 October 2013 and 26 January 2014, sponsored by the Union Cycliste Internationale (UCI).

The men's competition was won by the Dutchman Lars van der Haar, who also won three of the seven races. World Champion Sven Nys was quickly out of competition for the general classification after having several mechanical problems in the first race, resulting in him giving up, and a total off-day in the second race where he only finished 22nd. Previous World Cup winner Niels Albert, of Belgium, won two races, but still finished only third in the general after his German teammate Philipp Walsleben; Walsleben did not manage to win any of the races, but consistently ranked high, grabbing four podium spots.

Katie Compton of the United States dominated the women's competition, winning five of the seven races. The remaining two were won by World Champion Marianne Vos who had undergone a cyst removal operation in November making her miss the races in Koksijde and Namur.

Events
In comparison to last season's eight races, this season only had seven. Plzeň, Roubaix and Hoogerheide were taken out of the programme – the latter ultimately hosting the World Championships – while Valkenburg and Nommay were added.

Individual standings

Men

Women

References

World Cup
World Cup
UCI Cyclo-cross World Cup